This is a list of Sites of Special Scientific Interest (SSSIs) in the Carmarthenshire Area of Search (AoS).

History
This Area of Search was formed from the entirety of the previous AoS of Carmarthen & Dinefwr, as well as having a few sites from the previous AoSs of West Glamorgan, Preseli & South Pembrokeshire and Brecknock.

Sites

See also
 List of SSSIs by Area of Search

References

Carmarthenshire
Carmarthenshire